The anomalous sea snake (Hydrophis anomalus) is a species of sea snake.
Its distribution includes the South Chinese Sea (Malaysia, Gulf of Thailand), and the Indian Ocean (Sumatra, Java, Borneo).

References

 Schmidt, Philipp (1852). "Beiträge zur ferneren Kenntniss der Meerschlangen". Abh. Nat. Ver. Hamburg 2(2): 69-86

anomalus
Reptiles described in 1852
Taxa named by Philipp Schmidt
Taxobox binomials not recognized by IUCN